Eastern Creek, a watercourse that is part of the Hawkesbury-Nepean catchment, is located in Greater Western Sydney, New South Wales, Australia.

Course and features

The creek descends  over its  course.

See also 

 Rivers of New South Wales

References

External links
 
 
 
 

Creeks and canals of Sydney
Hawkesbury River